Thomas Kojo (born May 22, 1972) is a Liberian former football defender. He currently coaches FC AK.

Kojo attended Lindsey Wilson College where he was a 1996 first team All NAIA soccer player.

Kojo was an assistant coach with FC AK.  On July 9, 2008, Kojo was appointed interim coach of FC AK after the surprise resignation of Ali Akan.

In November 2013, Kojo became the interim technical advisor for the national team for the second time, and will be in charge for the 2015 Africa Cup of Nations qualification.

On 9 January 2015, Kojo became technical director at Barrack Young Controllers FC.

References

External links 
 
 The Tennessee Rhythm signed Liberian striker Thomas Kojo - www.oursportscentral.com

1972 births
Living people
Liberian footballers
Liberian expatriate footballers
Liberia international footballers
2002 African Cup of Nations players
Mighty Barrolle players
Super League Greece players
Athinaikos F.C. players
Minnesota Thunder players
Maritzburg United F.C. players
Tennessee Rhythm players
Monrovia Black Star FC players
Expatriate soccer players in South Africa
Expatriate footballers in Greece
Association football defenders
Sportspeople from Monrovia
Lindsey Wilson Blue Raiders men's soccer players
Liberian football managers
Liberia national football team managers